Avi Malka (born 28 July 1987) is an Israeli footballer who plays as a center back for F.C. Dimona in Liga Alef.

References

1987 births
Living people
Israeli Jews
Israeli footballers
Association football defenders
Maccabi Be'er Sheva F.C. players
Maccabi Ironi Netivot F.C. players
Maccabi Herzliya F.C. players
Maccabi Kiryat Gat F.C. players
Hapoel Ashkelon F.C. players
Hapoel Katamon Jerusalem F.C. players
Hapoel Ashdod F.C. players
F.C. Dimona players
Liga Leumit players
Israeli Premier League players
Footballers from Beersheba